Adriatic Littoral may refer to:

Austrian Littoral, under the Habsburg Empire
Operational Zone Adriatic Coast, under Nazi occupation
Croatian Littoral, in Yugoslavia and at present